The Design District is a 330,000 square foot mixed use development located within the SouthEnd neighborhood in Charlotte, North Carolina. Formerly the location of the Nebel’s Knitting Mill, the historic warehouse buildings were constructed in 1927, and were sold to Asana Properties for $42.7 million in 2016. The overall development includes seven properties alongside Camden Street, Tremont Avenue, Kingston Avenue, and the Lynx Blue Line light rail. In 2017, Asana Properties announced that it would transition the property into a retail hub over the next five years. In 2018, Superica and Jeni's Splendid Ice Creams opened their first locations in North Carolina. In 2019, it was announced Shake Shack would open a third Charlotte location in the development.

Tenants

Allbirds
Barcelona Wine Bar
Bitty & Beau's Coffee Shop
The Candle Bar
Cosmic Nails
Elsewhere Cocktail Bar
Emmy Squared Pizza
Fifth Third Bank
First Wind Cycling
Fit Atelier
Girl Tribe Boutique
Hawkers
Jamie Scott Fitness
Jeni's Splendid Ice Creams
Libelle
Kenna Kunijo Salon
Krispy Kreme
Marine Layer
Ole Mason Jar (Men's Clothing)
Pepperbox Doughnuts
Pins Mechanical
Reid's Fine Foods
QC Pourhouse
Selenite Beauty
Shake Shack
Skiptown
Sub Zero/Wolf Showroom
Superica
Twenty Degrees Chocolates
Vow'd Bridal Boutique
UPS
16-Bit Arcade

References

Neighborhoods in Charlotte, North Carolina